Khorassania is a genus of snout moths described by Hans Georg Amsel in 1951

Species
Khorassania compositella (Treitschke, 1835)
Khorassania hartigi Amsel, 1951

References

Phycitini
Pyralidae genera
Taxa named by Hans Georg Amsel